İhsan Eryavuz, also known as "Topçu" İhsan ("Artilleryman" Ihsan), Mehmet İhsan Bey (1877– 6 March 1947) was a Turkish career officer, government minister and politician. He served as an officer of the Ottoman Army, and as a politician of the Republic of Turkey. He became Minister of the Navy in the cabinets of Ali Fethi Bey (Okyar) and Ismet Pasha (İnönü)

On January 26, 1928 Eryavuz was put on trial before the Supreme Court (formerly , today ) for charges on defraudation related to the repairs at the battlecruiser TCG Yavuz. He was sentenced to two years of aggravated imprisonment.

Works
Anılar (incomplete), Yeni Türkiye, 1946.

Medals and decorations
Medal of Independence with Green Ribbon

Sources

1877 births
1947 deaths
People from Üsküdar
Ottoman Imperial School of Military Engineering alumni
Ottoman Army officers
Ottoman military personnel of the Balkan Wars
Ottoman military personnel of World War I
Turkish people of the Turkish War of Independence
Recipients of the Medal of Independence with Green Ribbon (Turkey)
Deputies of Osmaniye
Government ministers of Turkey
Republican People's Party (Turkey) politicians
Turkish politicians convicted of crimes
Politicians convicted of fraud
Date of birth missing
Members of the 3rd government of Turkey
Members of the 4th government of Turkey